Oleksandr Dmytrovych Sorokalet (born 27 March 1959) is a Ukrainian former volleyball player who competed for the Soviet Union in the 1988 Summer Olympics.

He was born in Shostka.

In 1988 he was part of the Soviet team which won the silver medal in the Olympic tournament. He played all seven matches.

External links
 profile

1959 births
Living people
Ukrainian men's volleyball players
Soviet men's volleyball players
Olympic volleyball players of the Soviet Union
Volleyball players at the 1988 Summer Olympics
Olympic silver medalists for the Soviet Union
Olympic medalists in volleyball
People from Shostka
Medalists at the 1988 Summer Olympics
Sportspeople from Sumy Oblast